The Serbian Handball Super League ( / Superliga Srbije u rukometu) is the top men's handball league in Serbia. It was founded in 2006.

Rules

Competition format
The league is operated by the Handball Federation of Serbia. It is composed of 14 teams.

Current teams

Teams for season 2022–23

List of champions

Performances

In Serbia

All-time
 Including titles in Yugoslavia, Serbia and Montenegro

In European competitions

EHF coefficient ranking

As of 2021–22 season

24.  -1  Olís deildin  9.0024.  -3  Ligat Winner  9.00
26.  +2  Handball Premier 8.80
27.  +2  Super Liga 7.17
28.  -3  Sales Lentz League 6.33
29.  -3  Lotto Eredivisie 6.20

Serbian handball clubs in European competitions
EHF Champions League
Ex. European Cup

EHF European Cup
Ex. European City Cup

Sponsorships and broadcasting rights
 Merkur osiguranje
 Select
 EPS
 RTS

See also
 Serbian First League of Handball for Women
 Handball Federation of Serbia

Notes and references

External links
  
 Handball Federation of Serbia

First League of Handball
Serbia
Professional sports leagues in Serbia